John Tufton, 2nd Earl of Thanet (15 December 1608 – 7 May 1664) was an English nobleman and supporter of Charles I of England. He was the eldest son of Nicholas Tufton, 1st Earl of Thanet, and Lady Frances Cecil, granddaughter of William Cecil, 1st Baron Burghley.

Career
Thanet was a staunch Cavalier, taking part in the Battle of Edge Hill and in 1642 he led a regiment of 100 horse to try to raise a rebellion in Sussex, taking part in the Capture of Chichester, the Battle of Muster Green, and the Siege of Chichester in support of Sir William Brockman in Kent. However, Brockman's revolt quickly collapsed, and Thanet was forced to surrender. He suffered considerably from confiscations and sequestrations of his large estates during the English Civil War.

Among his properties was Bodiam Castle, purchased from the Levett family in 1639, which Thanet sold for £6,000 in 1644.

Personal life
On 21 April 1629, he married Lady Margaret Sackville (1614–1676), daughter of Richard Sackville, 3rd Earl of Dorset and Lady Anne Clifford. They had eleven children:
 Nicholas Tufton, 3rd Earl of Thanet (1631–1679).
 Lady Margaret Tufton (b. 1636), who married George Coventry, 3rd Baron Coventry on 18 July 1653.
 John Tufton, 4th Earl of Thanet (1638–1680).
 Richard Tufton, 5th Earl of Thanet (1640–1684).
 Thomas Tufton, 6th Earl of Thanet (1644–1729).
 Col. Sackville Tufton (–1721).
 Lady Anne Tufton, who died young.
 Lady Frances Tufton, who married Henry Drax, son of Sir James Drax, died without issue.
 Lady Cicely Tufton (1648–1672), who married Christopher Hatton, 1st Viscount Hatton on 12 February 1667.
 Lady Mary Tufton (d. 1674), who married Sir William Walter, 2nd Baronet (d. 1693).
 Lady Anne Tufton, who married Samuel Grimston.

Curiously, he was succeeded as Earl of Thanet by four of his sons in succession, the first three having no issue.

References
Notes

Bibliography

External links
Tufton genealogy

1608 births
1664 deaths
Earls of Thanet
Cavaliers
17th-century English nobility